Leeuwenhoekiella is a strictly aerobic bacterial genus from the family of Flavobacteriaceae.

References

Further reading 
 
 
 

 
Flavobacteria
Bacteria genera
Antonie van Leeuwenhoek